Gregory Wofford Twiggs (born October 30, 1960) is an American professional golfer who has played on the PGA Tour and the Nationwide Tour.

Twiggs was born in Los Angeles and grew up in southern California. He attended San Diego State University where he was a member of the golf team, a first team All-American his senior year. He turned professional in 1984.

Twiggs played full-time on the PGA Tour from 1984 until 1992, and had one official win. After 1992, he split his playing time between the PGA Tour and the Nationwide Tour; the majority of his time in the late 1990s was spent on the Nationwide Tour. His best finish in a major was T-22 at the 1993 PGA Championship.

In 1992, Twiggs and his wife decided to move from southern California to Greensboro, North Carolina, where they live today with their two daughters.

Professional wins (3)

PGA Tour wins (1)

Nike Tour wins (1)

Other wins (1)
1984 California State Open

Results in major championships

Note: Twiggs never played in The Open Championship.

"T" = tied

See also
1984 PGA Tour Qualifying School graduates
1988 PGA Tour Qualifying School graduates
1992 PGA Tour Qualifying School graduates

References

External links

American male golfers
San Diego State Aztecs men's golfers
PGA Tour golfers
Golfers from Los Angeles
Golfers from North Carolina
Sportspeople from Greensboro, North Carolina
1960 births
Living people